Martha Frankel (born July 18, 1953) is an American writer. She was born in the Bronx, New York.

She began her writing career at the original Details magazine, writing a column about plastic surgery titled Knifestyles of the Rich and Famous. She went on to write book reviews, essays and celebrity profiles for other magazines, such as Movieline, Cosmopolitan and The New Yorker.

Currently, she serves as executive director of the Woodstock Writers Festival, a yearly gathering of writers and readers in Woodstock, New York.

Martha is host of Woodstock Writers Radio, a Sunday morning radio talk show on WDST in Woodstock, New York.

Her memoir, Hats & Eyeglasses, chronicling her family's lifelong love affair with gambling, was published in 2008 (Tarcher/Penguin Group). "Hats and eyeglasses" is an old gambling expression describing an unfortunate run at the table. In Frankel's childhood, gambling equated to friendship, food and laughter. "We bet on everything, from sports to how much our mothers would lose at Weight Watchers," Frankel recalls in the book.

Her second book, Brazilian Sexy: Secrets to Living a Gorgeous and Confident Life (co-written with Janea Padilha) was published in April 2010 (Perigee/Penguin Group). Her essay "Looped Yarn" appears in the anthology Knitting Yarns: Writers on Knitting (2013), published by W. W. Norton & Company.

Frankel is a winner of a New York Foundation for the Arts (NYFFA) Award in creative nonfiction. She was the 1997 Philip Morris Fellow at the MacDowell Colony, and the 2003 Artist-in-Residence at SUNY Ulster, where she taught a class in memoir writing.

She has lived in the upstate New York town of Boiceville for over 30 years, with her husband, artist Steve Heller.

References

External links
 https://web.archive.org/web/20100114024228/http://woodstockwritersfestival.com/
 https://www.nytimes.com/2008/02/07/garden/07frankel.html?_r=2&ref=garden&oref=slogin
 http://www.hvmag.com/Hudson-Valley-Magazine/September-2008/Wild-Card/
 http://www.largeheartedboy.com/blog/archive/2008/02/book_notes_mart.html
 http://www.dailyfreeman.com/articles/2009/03/19/life/doc49c1563d45667420926320.txt

1953 births
Living people
Writers from New York (state)
People from the Bronx